This is a list of Brazilian television related events from 1974.

Events

Debuts

Television shows

1970s
Vila Sésamo (1972-1977, 2007–present)

Births
6 July - Babi Xavier, actress, singer & TV host
8 August - Preta Gil, singer & actress
17 October - Bárbara Paz, actress & model

Deaths

See also
1974 in Brazil